Ormakal Marikkumo is a 1977 Indian Malayalam-language film, directed and produced by K. S. Sethumadhavan. The film stars Kamal Haasan, Shoba and Vidhubala. The film has musical score by M. S. Viswanathan. Shobha won the Kerala State Film Award for Second Best Actress. This film was later dubbed in Telugu language as Parvathi Malli Puttindi and Hindi as Afsana Do Dil Kaa.

Plot
Kamal Haasan and Vidhubala are a happily married couple who enjoy their life. The first half is full of scenes that involve both of them. The story goes into a flashback where Kamal Haasan and Vidhubala are a couple where Kamal Haasan suspects Vidhubala and kills her. Shoba reincarnates as Vidhubala and tells the truth to Kamal Haasan. Upon hearing the story, Kamal Haasan gets himself killed by running towards a lorry. The film ends in a sad note with both Kamal Haasan and Shoba dying at the end.

Cast

Kamal Haasan as Chandrasekharan
Shobha as Ammini/Parvathi
Vidhubala as Parvathi
Jayan as Prabhakaran
M. G. Soman as Dr. Aravindan
Sankaradi as Chandrasekharan's uncle
T. R. Omana as Thankamani
Prema as Lakshmi/Aravindan's mother
Kunchan as Pappu
Pala Thankam as Chellamma
Paravoor Bharathan as Narayanan
Poojappura Ravi as Vaidyar
Radhadevi as Janakiyamma
Mythili as Usha
Vanchiyoor Radha as Teacher
Ramu as Ravi
Kedamangalam Ali

Production 
In an interview with Ravi Menon on the talk show Chakkarapanthal, actress Vidhubala recalled shooting the slow motion song sequence in this film, She and Kamal Haasan actually moved and danced slowly since the technique had not yet been introduced in Malayalam cinema.

Soundtrack
The music was composed by M. S. Viswanathan with lyrics by Mankombu Gopalakrishnan.

Release 
Ormakal Marikkumo was released on 26 August 1977. Shobha won the Kerala State Film Award for Second Best Actress. The film was dubbed in Telugu language as Parvathi Malli Puttindi and released on 27 August 1982, Hindi as Afsana Do Dil Kaa (1982).

References

External links
 

1977 films
1970s Malayalam-language films
Films scored by M. S. Viswanathan
Films directed by K. S. Sethumadhavan